Hamad bin Said (died 13 March 1792) was ruler of Oman, the third of the Al Said dynasty, ruling the country between 1786 and 1792.

Rule

Hamad bin Said was the son of the Imam and Sultan Said bin Ahmad, who succeeded to those positions in 1783 on the death of his father, Ahmad bin Said al-Busaidi.  
Said bin Ahmad was increasingly unpopular. Around the end of 1785 a group of notables elected his brother, Qais bin Ahmad, as Imam.
This revolt soon collapsed.

In 1786 Hamad bin Said managed to get control of Muscat, with its fortress.
One by one the other fortresses in Oman submitted to Hamad.
Said no longer had any temporal power.
Hamad took the title of Sheikh and established his court in Muscat. His father, Said bin Ahmad, remained in Rustaq and retained the title of Imam, but this was purely a symbolic religious title that carried no power. Hamad died of smallpox in 1792. He was succeeded by his uncle, Sultan bin Ahmad.

References
Citations

Sources

1792 deaths
18th-century Arabs
18th-century Omani people
Al Said dynasty
Omani imams
People from Muscat, Oman
Sons of Omani sultans
Sultans of Oman
Year of birth unknown